Sugar Grove is an unincorporated community in Clark County, Ohio, USA.

History
Sugar Grove was laid out in 1874.

References

Unincorporated communities in Clark County, Ohio
1874 establishments in Ohio
Populated places established in 1874
Unincorporated communities in Ohio